Cheng Feng-shih (born 27 December 1941) is a Taiwanese politician.

Education
Cheng studied public relations at National Chengchi University, and later earned a master's degree in the subject at Tunghai University.

Career
Cheng was elected to the Taipei County Council in 1968. He was subsequently elected to the National Assembly in 1972 and 1975. During his tenure as an assemblyman, Cheng chaired the presidium of the National Assembly. Between 1981 and 1993, Cheng sat on the Taiwan Provincial Council. Cheng was elected to his first term on the Legislative Yuan in 1995 with 3.28% of the vote, representing the multimember Taipei County district. He was subsequently placed on the Kuomintang party list and reelected twice via proportional representation. Until August 2000, Cheng was chairman of Taiwan Television, when he was succeeded by Lai Kuo-chou.

As a legislator, Cheng was also a member of the board of Kuang Wu Institute of Technology. While a member of the Legislative Yuan, Cheng led the Kuomintang legislative caucus, within the Kuomintang's Central Standing Committee, and was deputy director of the party's policy committee. He retained the policy committee position for some time after stepping down as a legislator. 

References

1941 births
Living people
Members of the 3rd Legislative Yuan
Members of the 4th Legislative Yuan
Members of the 5th Legislative Yuan
Party List Members of the Legislative Yuan
New Taipei Members of the Legislative Yuan
New Taipei City Councilors
20th-century Taiwanese businesspeople
Television executives
Taiwanese business executives
Tunghai University alumni
National Chengchi University alumni